Isabella of Villehardouin (1260/1263 – 23 January 1312) was reigning Princess of Achaea from 1289 to 1307. She was the elder daughter of Prince William II of Achaea and of his third wife, Anna Komnene Doukaina, the second daughter of Michael II Komnenos Doukas, the despot of Epiros.

First marriage
On 28 May 1271 Isabella married Philip of Sicily, son of Charles I of Sicily. This marriage had been pre-determined by the Treaty of Viterbo in May 1267 between Charles, the exiled Baldwin II of Constantinople and Isabella's father. Taking advantage of the precarious situation of the remains of the Latin Empire in the face of renascent Greek power, Charles gained suzerain rights over Achaea; furthermore, the heirs of Baldwin and William were to marry children of Charles, and Charles was to have the reversion of both the empire and the principality should the couples have no heirs.

Philip became titular King of Thessalonica in 1274, but he died on 1 January 1277, predeceasing his father. In line with the treaty, on the death of Isabella's father William, in 1278, it was her father-in-law Charles who succeeded to the throne of Achaea.

Remarriage and reign
Charles I died in 1285, to be succeeded by his son Charles II. In 1289, on Isabella's marriage to Florent of Hainaut, Charles II conferred on the couple the Principality of Achaea, on condition that, if she survived her husband, Isabella would not remarry without Charles II's consent. Florent and Isabella had a daughter, Matilda.

As Prince, Florent negotiated the Treaty of Glarentsa with the Byzantine Empire in 1290. The peace lasted until 1293, when the Greeks retook Kalamata; Florent's emissaries, however, persuaded Andronikos II Palaiologos to return it. In 1296, the Greeks retook the castle of Saint George in Arcadia. Florent laid siege to it, but died in 1298 before it could be taken.

Isabella was married again in Rome on 12 February 1301. Her third husband was Philip of Savoy, Lord of Piedmont, who now became prince of Achaea in his turn. Philip aimed to reconquer the whole of Lacedaemonia from the Byzantine Empire. He was an authoritarian ruler and this put him at odds with the barons of his realm. He tried to placate the barons of Morea, but was forced to accept a parliament in 1304. The Greek peasantry, crushed by taxes, then revolted in turn. In 1306 Philip and Isabella were summoned to Charles II's court at Naples. Philip was accused of disloyalty and failure to support Charles in a campaign against Epirus, and Isabella of failing to seek her suzerain's consent before marrying Philip. Charles deprived the two of Achaea and on 5 May 1306 bestowed it directly upon his son Philip I of Taranto.

Later life
Philip of Savoy eventually relinquished his claim to Achaea on 11 May 1307 in exchange for the County of Alba. Isabella separated from him and went to live in Hainaut, continuing to assert her right to the principality. Isabella died on 23 January 1312, after which Philip of Savoy remarried. On Philip of Taranto's death in 1313, Isabella's daughter by Florent, Matilda of Hainaut, became Princess of Achaea.

Sources

External links
Medieval Lands Project

1260 births
1312 deaths
Villehardouin family
Princesses of Achaea
13th-century Italian women
13th-century women rulers
14th-century women rulers
14th-century Italian women
13th-century people from the Principality of Achaea
14th-century people from the Principality of Achaea